"O Siem" is a song written by Inuit musician Susan Aglukark and Chad Irschick. It was recorded by Aglukark on her 1995 album This Child, and was released that year as the album's first single. The song went to number one on both the Canadian RPM country and adult contemporary charts that year, and peaked at number three on the pop charts.

Content
Alternating between English and Halkomelem, the song was the first top-10 hit in Canada for an Inuk performer. Lyrically, it is a protest against racism and prejudice.

Musicians
 Susan Aglukark: vocals
 Michael Francis: guitars
 Tom Szczesniak: bass
 Claude Desjardins: drums, percussion
 Ray Parker: organ
 Chad Irschick: synth, percussion
 David Blamires: background vocals
 Debbie Fleming: background vocals

Chart performance
The song debuted at number 85 on the Canadian RPM Country Tracks on the chart dated January 16, 1995 and spent 12 weeks on the chart before peaking at number one on April 3.

Weekly charts

Year-end charts

In Media  

"O Siem" was featured heavily in Season 7 of the popular Crave and Hulu TV series Letterkenny.

References

1995 songs
1995 singles
Susan Aglukark songs
Macaronic songs
Songs against racism and xenophobia
EMI Records singles